Kinder Chocolate is a chocolate bar produced by Italian multinational confectionery company Ferrero.

Description 
In Alba, Italy, in 1968, Michele Ferrero, proposed to market a product that was palatable to children (with chocolate) and at the same time reassuring to mothers (with milk), thus the slogan "+ milk (latte) - cocoa (cacao)" shown on the package. In 1968, Kinder Chocolate, a milk chocolate with a milky filling, was introduced to the German and Italian markets, gained commercial success, and was later sold in other European countries. The face of a child is depicted (first by Günter Euringer, then by Matteo Farneti) on the right side of Kinder Chocolate bar packages to suggest to buyers the idea of ​​a product for children.

The product is 40% milk chocolate, with 53% sugar, 33% milk powder and 13% cocoa.

Kinder Maxi is a larger version of the Kinder Chocolate.

References

External links
 
 

Ferrero SpA brands
German confectionery
Italian confectionery